March District is a district in Canton of Schwyz, Switzerland. The coat of arms of the district is gules, an annulet sable — a black ring on a red background.

References

External links
 

Districts of the canton of Schwyz